The Dallas–Fort Worth metroplex is a metropolitan statistical area consisting of two metropolitan divisions: Dallas–Plano–Irving and Fort Worth–Arlington, within the state of Texas, USA. The Metroplex is home to several institutions of higher learning, including:

See also

 List of colleges and universities in Texas

References

Colleges and universities
Dallas - Fort Worth
Dallas - Fort Worth area colleges and universities